Jamie Stanton (born 7 November 1995) is an Australian rules footballer playing for the Gold Coast Suns in the AFL Women's (AFLW). She previously played for the Brisbane Lions from 2017 to 2018 and the North Melbourne Football Club in 2019. Stanton was the inaugural Gold Coast Club Champion in her first season at the club in 2020 and was Gold Coast's equal leading goalkicker in 2021.

Early life
Stanton grew up on the Gold Coast where she attended St Andrews Lutheran College and excelled in soccer, earning selection for the junior Matildas as a teenager. Following high school graduation, she accepted a four-year soccer scholarship to attend Lindsey Wilson College in Kentucky but lost passion for the sport and returned to Queensland after one year in the United States. She then began playing Australian rules football for the first time at 19 when she was invited to play for Coolangatta Tweed Heads in the Queensland Women's Australian Football League (QWAFL).

AFL Women's career

She made her debut in the Lions' inaugural game against Melbourne at Casey Fields on 5 February 2017. Brisbane signed Stanton for the 2018 season during the trade period in May 2017.

In May 2018, Stanton joined expansion team  for the 2019 AFL Women's season.

In April 2019, Stanton left North Melbourne to return to Queensland and join new expansion team  for the 2020 AFL Women's season. She made her Gold Coast debut in the club's inaugural game against  at Blacktown ISP Oval, and was named among Gold Coast's best players. Stanton was best afield in Gold Coast's inaugural win against  at Metricon Stadium the following week, playing a tagging role on Richmond captain Katie Brennan despite a shoulder injury during the game, and was selected in womens.afls Team of the Week for that round. Finishing the season as one of fourteen players to have played the most AFL Women's matches to that point with 30, she went on to be selected in the initial 40-woman squad for the 2020 AFL Women's All-Australian team and was the inaugural Gold Coast Club Champion.

Statistics
Updated to the end of the 2022 season.

|- style=background:#EAEAEA
| 2017 ||  || 17
| 8 || 0 || 0 || 60 || 14 || 74 || 15 || 23 || 0.0 || 0.0 || 7.5 || 1.8 || 9.3 || 1.9 || 2.9 || 0
|-
| 2018 ||  || 17
| 8 || 0 || 1 || 96 || 37 || 133 || 21 || 25 || 0.0 || 0.1 || 12.0 || 4.6 || 16.6 || 2.6 || 3.1 || 0
|- style=background:#EAEAEA
| 2019 ||  || 17
| 7 || 0 || 1 || 80 || 40 || 120 || 35 || 29 || 0.0 || 0.1 || 11.4 || 5.7 || 16.1 || 5.0 || 4.1 || 3
|-
| 2020 ||  || 17
| 7 || 2 || 3 || 89 || 31 || 120 || 20 || 26 || 0.3 || 0.4 || 12.7 || 4.4 || 17.1 || 2.9 || 3.7 || 2
|- style=background:#EAEAEA
| 2021 ||  || 17
| 6 || 3 || 5 || 55 || 20 || 75 || 12 || 24 || 0.5 || 0.8 || 9.2 || 3.3 || 12.5 || 2.0 || 4.0 || 1
|-
| 2022 ||  || 17
| 10 || 2 || 5 || 108 || 31 || 139 || 15 || 56 || 0.2 || 0.5 || 10.8 || 3.1 || 13.9 || 1.5 || 5.6 || 3
|- class=sortbottom
! colspan=3 | Career
! 46 !! 7 !! 15 !! 488 !! 173 !! 661 !! 118 !! 183 !! 0.2 !! 0.3 !! 10.6 !! 3.8 !! 14.4 !! 2.6 !! 4.0 !! 9
|}

Honours and achievements
Team
 AFL Women's minor premiership: 2017

Individual
 Gold Coast Club Champion: 2020
 Gold Coast equal leading goalkicker: 2021

References

External links

 
 
 

1995 births
Living people
Sportspeople from the Gold Coast, Queensland
Sportswomen from Queensland
Australian rules footballers from Queensland
Brisbane Lions (AFLW) players
North Melbourne Football Club (AFLW) players
Gold Coast Football Club (AFLW) players